The Nobles is a series of novels by David Cook, Victor Milán, Mark Anthony, Brian Thomsen, Paul Kidd, and Lynn Abbey, set in the Forgotten Realms campaign setting.

Plot summary
The books all touch on the schemes of the nobility in Faerûn, and are a look into the politics behind powers such as Tethyr, Waterdeep, and the Vilhon Reach.

Novels
 King Pinch, by David Cook (paperback, May 1995)
 War in Tethyr, by Victor Milán (paperback, October 1995)
 Escape from Undermountain, by Mark Anthony (paperback, February 1996)
 The Mage in the Iron Mask, by Brian Thomsen (paperback, August 1996)
 The Council of Blades, by Paul Kidd (paperback, November 1997)
 The Simbul's Gift, by Lynn Abbey (paperback, November 1997)

References

Fantasy novel series
Forgotten Realms novel series